The 1973 Gitchie Manitou murders involved an attack on a group of five teenagers at Gitchie Manitou State Preserve in Lyon County, Iowa. Four of the teenagers were killed and a fifth was kidnapped and raped. Allen, James, and David Fryer were later convicted of the crimes and sentenced to life in prison. The attack took place on November 17, 1973.

Background

On the evening of November 17, 1973, five teenagers from Sioux Falls, South Dakota were attacked by a group of three brothers.  Four of the teenagers were killed and one was kidnapped and raped. Those killed were Roger Essem (male, 17), Stewart Baade (male, 18), Dana Baade (male, 14), and Michael Hadrath (male, 15).  Sandra Cheskey (female, 13) was raped, but survived the attack.  Her testimony was instrumental in bringing the perpetrators to justice.

The perpetrators of this slaying were Allen Fryer (male, 29), David Fryer (male, 24), and James Fryer (male 21) of Sioux Falls, South Dakota.

The murders
The Fryer brothers were in Gitchie Manitou State Preserve looking for illumination to poach deer and happened upon the victims sitting around a campfire, singing.  David Fryer was sent to spy on the group and reported back to his brothers that the teenagers had marijuana.  The brothers conferred and decided to take the victims' marijuana by impersonating narcotics officers.  Testimony at the trial indicated that the Fryers apparently thought narcotics agents were allowed to indiscriminately kill drug users.

After getting shotguns from their truck, Allen, James, and David Fryer positioned themselves on a ridge overlooking the victims and opened fire.  Roger Essem was killed immediately and Stewart Baade fell wounded.  At this point, the remaining teenagers took cover in the trees.

The Fryers ordered the teenagers to come out of the trees, so Michael Hadrath and Sandra Cheskey emerged together and asked the Fryers who they thought they were.  Allen Fryer then shot Hadrath in the arm and said that they were police officers.  Hadrath and Cheskey fell to the ground, but were forced to get up by Allen Fryer who said they were playing dead.

Allen and David Fryer forced Dana Baade, Michael Hadrath, and Sandra Cheskey along a trail away from the campfire. Sandra Cheskey was tied up and placed in the victims' van.  During this time, Stewart Baade was also brought back to the van from where he had been wounded.

Allen Fryer then drove away in the van with Sandra Cheskey, leaving Stewart Baade, Dana Baade, and Michael Hadrath standing near the road with James and David Fryer.  After Allen left, James and David Fryer killed the three teenagers with shotguns. The bodies were discovered the next day by a couple from Sioux Falls, SD who drove to the park while trying out their new car. Roger Essems' body wasn't discovered until the following day because it was left lying by the campfire, the site of the first encounter.

Allen Fryer told Sandra Cheskey that he was a police officer while they drove around, that he was "The Boss", and that the other two would do as he instructed them.  After a short time, James and David Fryer met them on the road in the pickup.  Allen and Sandy got into the truck, and the group drove to a farm.  At this point, James Fryer raped Sandra Cheskey. Early the next morning, Allen filled the vehicle's tank with gasoline from a large red fuel tank then drove Cheskey home, still under the pretense of being a police officer, saying that Sandra was "too young to get busted".

Investigation 
Because of Sandra's composure and bluntness about the rape, and all the details she remembered especially well for someone at such young age (13) some investigators questioned her credibility. She was interviewed many times and passed a polygraph test.

On November 29, 1973, Sandra Cheskey was accompanied by Craig Vinson (Lyon County, Iowa, Sheriff) as they drove around the countryside looking for the farm house where Sandy was held captive and raped. Near Hartford, South Dakota, she recognized the farmhouse by the large red fuel tank that stood next to the garage. The farm was owned by Allen Fryer's employer, a local farmer.  By a chance, Allen Fryer then drove by in the same blue pickup that was used the night of the murders. Sandy told Sheriff Vinson "That's him. That's the boss." Law enforcement quickly pulled the truck over and arrested Allen Fryer. David and James Fryer were also arrested shortly after.

Allen Fryer claimed that Cheskey's friends were the ones shooting at him and his brothers the night of the murders and they "accidentally" killed someone. By Allen's 3rd interview he told the truth but was still trying to justify their action saying the 5 teens had been drinking and smoking marijuana, and the Fryer brothers wanted to steal it. David Fryer told a similar story, and then later changed his story to what really happened.

November 30, 1973, Cheskey identified both David and James Fryer in a lineup.

The interview with James Fryer was much different, as he immediately turned the blame to his brothers. He also confirmed David Fryer's story believing the teens had been smoking marijuana, that Allen Fryer was pretending to be a detective, and that Cheskey was laughing, having a good time, and willingly had sex with David and James. James also blamed his brother for killing all four of the teenage boys. James Fryer was serving time in jail during the time of the murders, but was enrolled in the Work Release Program. Instead of going back to jail, David called the jail impersonating his boss saying James needed to work an extra shift, and instead James went off with his brothers.

Allen and David Fryer were moved from Sioux Falls, SD to Lyon County Jail in Rock Rapids, Iowa. James Fryer remained in Sioux Falls because he was currently serving a jail sentence. On December 1st, 1973, all three brothers were arraigned and charged with four counts of murder. Bond was set at $400,000 per man, amounting to $100,000 for each boy slain.

Trial
Sandra Cheskey's testimony was instrumental, as it comprised the bulk of evidence against the Fryer brothers during the 18 months of trial. There were some issues at the trial involving confusion by Cheskey, most of which can be attributed to her age at the time (13). 

On February 12, 1974, David Fryer pled guilty to the open charge of murder, guilty to three charges of murder, and one charge of manslaughter. David admitted to killing Stewart Baade (18). The judge sentenced David to life in prison without the possibility of parole, to which he replied "no". David said, "If all my appeals fail, I'll actually write the governor and ask for the death penalty. I won't live out my life in jail. Keeping me locked up for life can't turn around what happened. It can't bring those people back." In 2016, David asked the Parole Board to overturn the "without possibility of parole", and it was denied after a testimony by Cheskey and Mike Hadrath's sister Lynette.

Allen Fryer was subjected to psychiatric testing, and was found fit to stand trial. February 1974, Allen began his trial at the Lyon County Court House. May 20, 1974, Allen was found guilty of four counts of first degree murder and was sentenced to four consecutive life terms in prison.

James Fryer agreed to extradition from Sioux Falls, SD to Iowa, but later fought the extradition thinking he might end up back out on the streets.

On June 18, 1974, after Allen Fryer's trial, he and James Fryer escaped from the Lyon County Jail, stole a vehicle, and fled the state. They were arrested in Gillette, Wyoming, and brought back to face federal charges.

James' trial began December 3, 1974 in Lyon County at Dickinson County, Iowa where a state psychiatrist determined James had an IQ of 85 and poorly controlled his behavior. December 30, 1974 James Fryer was found guilty of three charges of first degree murder and one charge of manslaughter. Because James was going to be serving life in jail without parole  the District Attorney believed there was no need to subject Cheskey to a rape trial.

All three of the Fryer brothers were sentenced to life without the possibility of parole, and all appeals fell through for all Fryer brothers.  Allen is serving his life sentence at the Penitentiary in Anamosa, Iowa. David and James are currently serving their life sentences at the Fort Dodge Correctional Facility in Fort Dodge, Iowa.

References

Further reading
In addition to Allen Fryer v. Nix (mentioned below), the following decisions provide a great deal of background for the 1973 murder case:
STATE OF IOWA, Appellee v. JAMES RAY FRYER, Appellant; No. 58103; Supreme Court of Iowa; 243 N.W.2d 1; 1976 Iowa Sup.
STATE OF IOWA, Appellee v. DAVID LYLE FRYER, Appellant; No. 57308; Supreme Court of Iowa; 226 N.W.2d 36; 1975 Iowa Sup.
ALLEN E. FRYER, Appellant, v. STATE OF IOWA, Appellee; No. 347 / 66755; Supreme Court of Iowa; 325 N.W.2d 400; 1982 Iowa Sup.

 The Gitchie Manitou murders are the subject of a 2016 book by Phil and Sandy Hamman, with first-hand accounts from Sandra Cheskey, titled Gitchie Girl.

 Gitchie Girl Uncovered: The True Story of a Night of Mass Murder and the Hunt for the Deranged Killers, by Phil Hamman & Sandy Hamman (2019)

External links
Iowa Department of Natural Resources
Allen Fryer's appeal to 8th Circuit- Fryer v. Nix contains a recounting of the facts of the case
Iowa Department of Corrections Offender Information- searchable inmate database
Des Moines Register article about mass killings that mentions the Fryer case- lists massacres throughout Iowa history

Crimes in Iowa
1973 in Iowa
Lyon County, Iowa
1973 murders in the United States